Taxi Car is a 1972 Indian Malayalam- language detective film, directed and produced by P. Venu. The film stars Prem Nazir, Sadhana, Vijayasree and Vincent in the lead roles. The film had musical score by R. K. Shekhar. 

Thie film is a sequel to the 1971 film C.I.D. Nazir.

Premise
With the menace of a counterfeiting racket operating in Kerala on the rise, CID Nazir is tasked to bring the perpetrators to justice.

Cast

Prem Nazir as CID Nazir
Vidhubala as Geetha
Vijayasree as Rani
Vincent as Vincent
Adoor Bhasi as Nambiar, Bhasi (double role)
Hari
Jose Prakash as Shivaram
Prema as Kamalam
Shobha as Baby Shobha
Sreelatha Namboothiri as Sreelatha
T. S. Muthaiah as Father Frederick 
Bahadoor as Nadathara Rajappan
Kaduvakulam Antony
Kunchan
P. R. Menon as Keshava Pilla
Pala Thankam

Soundtrack
The music was composed by R. K. Shekhar and the lyrics were written by Sreekumaran Thampi.

References

External links
 

1972 films
1970s Malayalam-language films
CIDNazir2
Indian sequel films
Films directed by P. Venu